Reyhanluy-e Olya (also Romanized as Reyḩānlūy-e ‘Olyā; also known as Reyḩanlū-ye ‘Olyā and Reyḩānlū-ye ‘Olyā) is a village in Chaldoran-e Shomali Rural District, in the Central District of Chaldoran County, West Azerbaijan Province, Iran. At the 2006 census, its population was 215, in 42 families.

References 

Populated places in Chaldoran County